Palmersbridge is a hamlet on the A30 main road northeast of Bolventor in Cornwall, England, UK.

References

Hamlets in Cornwall